Forever My Lady is the debut studio album by American R&B quartet Jodeci, released May 28, 1991, by Uptown Records and MCA Records.

Background
The album's production and composition was largely attributed to DeVante Swing, who worked alongside Grammy-nominated producer Al B. Sure! to craft the album's sound. Recording sessions took place at various recording studios during 1990 to 1991, and were relentlessly worked upon in order to shift the consensus with R&B music. The duo worked to add more of a hip-hop sound to the album, incorporating synthesizer-heavy rhythm tracks to complement the alternating themes discussed throughout the album, ranging from passionate and elegant songs about love, to energetic and swaggering songs centered around sex and partying. The group's emotionally transparent lyrics are delivered in both rapped and sung verses, help to explore the feelings of love and seduction.

Release and reception
The album received overwhelmingly positive reviews from critics, who complimented the group's innovative nature when approaching the album, as well as its thematic choices and the production from Swing. Following an anticipated release, it debuted at number one on the Top R&B Albums on its first week, and peaked at eighteen on the U.S. Billboard 200. Three of the album's singles charted on the Billboard Hot 100, including the top-15 hit "Come and Talk to Me". Forever My Lady was soon certified multi-platinum by the Recording Industry Association of America and, as of August 1995, has sold over three million copies in the US and over eight million copies worldwide.

Arion Berger of Entertainment Weekly gave the effort a good review, calling the work "sophisticated beyond the band members' years" and noting that "if they can keep up the momentum of this commercially successful debut (which has already gone Top 40 on the Billboard pop album chart), Jodeci will be a force to be reckoned with." Los Angeles Times critic Dennis Hunt was less impressed, writing that "the singing is so-so but the production is outstanding."

Track listing
All tracks are somewhat produced by DeVante Swing, except where noted.

Personnel
Adapted from Allmusic.

Art Direction – Reiner Design Consultants
Assistant Engineering – Ellen Fitton, Michael Gilbert, Marnie Riley, Jay A. Ryan
Engineering – Paul Logus, Dennis Mitchell, Mark Partis
Mastering – Herb Powers
Writer - Al B. Sure! 
Mixing – Al B. Sure!, Mick Guzauski
Multi-Instruments – DeVante Swing
Production Coordination – Eloise Bryan
Programming – Al B. Sure!, Dalvin DeGrate, DeVante Swing

Charts

Weekly charts

Year-end charts

Certifications

References

External links
 
 Forever My Lady at Discogs

See also
List of number-one R&B albums of 1991 (U.S.)
Billboard Year-End

1991 debut albums
Jodeci albums
MCA Records albums
Uptown Records albums